is a 1996 horror-themed light gun shooter arcade game developed by Sega AM1 and released by Sega. It is the first game in the House of the Dead series. Players assume the role of agents Thomas Rogan and "G" in their efforts to combat the products of the dangerous, inhumane experiments of Dr. Curien, a mad scientist.

The game was developed for over a year on the Sega Model 2 arcade hardware. Targeting an adult audience, AM1 devised a story and atmosphere inspired by Western horror films. AM1's plans for detailed environments, non-linear level designs, and a gory aesthetic were challenged — and often limited — by the Model 2 hardware and other factors.

The House of the Dead was well-received by critics. It has been, along with Resident Evil, credited with popularising zombie video games, as well as re-popularising zombies in wider popular culture from the late 1990s onwards, leading to renewed interest in zombie films during the 2000s. The game has also been credited with introducing fast running zombies, which became popular in zombie films and video games during the 2000s.

A remake of the game was developed by MegaPixel Studio and published by Forever Entertainment for Nintendo Switch, PlayStation 4, Stadia, Windows, and Xbox One in April 2022, for Xbox Series X/S in September 2022, and for PlayStation 5 in January 2023.

Gameplay

The House of the Dead is a rail shooter light gun game. Players use a light gun (or mouse, in the PC version) to aim and shoot at approaching zombies. The characters' pistols use magazines which hold 6 rounds; players reload by shooting away from the screen. When a player sustains damage or shoots an innocent, one point of health is removed. The continue screen appears when all health is lost. If the player runs out of continues, the game is over. First-aid packs are available throughout the game which restore one point of health; some can be obtained from rescued hostages, while others are hidden inside certain breakable objects. Special items can be found within other breakables, granting a bonus to the player who shoots them. The player can earn additional health power-ups at the end of each level based on the number of hostages rescued.

Throughout the course of the game, players are faced with numerous situations in which their action (or inaction) will have an effect on the direction of gameplay. This is exemplified in the opening stage of the game when a hostage is about to be thrown from the bridge to his death. If the player saves the hostage, they will enter the house directly through the front door; however, if the player fails to rescue the hostage, the character is redirected to an underground route through the sewers. If the player rescues all hostages, a secret room full of lives and bonuses is revealed toward the end of the game.

Players can score additional points by shooting enemies in the head and by rescuing hostages.

Plot 
The renowned biochemist and geneticist Dr. Curien becomes obsessed with discovering the nature of life and death. While supported by the DBR Corporation and its own team of scientists, Curien's behaviour becomes more erratic and his experiments take a gruesome turn. The Curien Mansion in Europe, which serves as his home and laboratory, experiences an outbreak.

On December 18, 1998, AMS Agent Thomas Rogan receives a distress call from his fiancée Sophie Richards from the Curien Mansion. Rogan and his partner "G" fly to Europe and arrive at the estate, finding it overrun with undead creatures, which Curien unleashed. A mortally wounded man gives them a journal containing information about Curien's creations and their weaknesses. Rogan and G reach Sophie, only to witness her being carried away by a gargoyle-like creature called the Hangedman. They later find Sophie, before she is attacked by the Chariot, a heavily armoured mutant armed with a bardiche. After killing the mutant, Rogan and G attend to Sophie, who tells them they must stop Curien or else "something terrible will happen," before passing out. A furious Rogan goes after the Hangedman to the rooftops surrounding the courtyard. After a lengthy battle, Rogan and G shoot it down. The two eventually confront Curien who is protected by an armoured, spider-like creature called The Hermit. After killing it, Rogan and G continue to proceed.

Arriving at the mansion's laboratory, Curien unleashes his masterpiece, The Magician, a humanoid creature with pyrokinetic abilities. However, the Magician refuses to serve any master and mortally wounds its creator. Curien expresses his confusion regarding his creation's loyalty before succumbing to his injuries. Rogan and G battle the Magician until it explodes, and then they leave the mansion.

Endings
There are three different endings, with which one players see determined by their score rank. In what the developers called the "normal ending", Sophie is reanimated and becomes a zombie. What the developers have referred to as the "true ending" is only seen if the players get the highest rank: Sophie is alive, having survived her injuries. In the third ending, a far view of the mansion is shown and Sophie is absent (leaving it unknown if she survived or not).

Development and release
Development started in December 1995 and took one year and three months. None of the development team could speak English, so they arrived at the name The House of the Dead by taking various horror-themed phrases in Japanese and picking the one where the English translated text had the most "cool" visual, without concern for what sort of connotations the phrase might have to English speakers. The team saw people in their 20s and 30s as their target audience, and hoped that the game would primarily be experienced as a two-player game.

The House of the Dead was built on the Virtua Cop game engine. The developers wanted to have a more complex system of path branches, and to have the system impact the game's story, but eventually realized these ideas were too ambitious to fulfill within the time allotted to make the game.

The enemy designs were drafted quickly, going from idea directly to design drawing without any rough sketches. Anticipating that foreign markets, particularly Germany, would require the violence be toned down, they built in an option for operators to change the color of the game's blood, with green, purple, and blue available in addition to the traditional red. They also cut a female zombie from the game because they felt she looked too much like a normal elderly woman, which could provoke controversy given that the player is encouraged to shoot the zombies. The Chariot was animated by using motion capture with an actor wielding a broom, but the other enemies were all animated manually, using motion capture for reference only.

Sega AM4 designed the game's cabinet using screenshots and illustrations given to them by AM1. The House of the Dead came in two cabinet formats, both upright: one with a 50-inch monitor and one with a 29-inch monitor.

Ports
In late 1997 Sega confirmed that work had begun on a port to Sega Saturn, as an early version had been delivered to them. The port was handled by Tantalus Interactive and released in 1998, with a port to Windows (PC-CD) by Sega arriving the same year. Extra game modes were added to both ports, which include selectable characters with different weapons and a boss rush mode.

Both the Sega Saturn and PC editions have slightly remixed soundtracks. On Chapter 2, there is a reference to the Space Shuttle Challenger disaster, as the words "Challenger, go at throttle up", spoken by Richard O. Covey from the mission control room only seconds before the explosion, can be heard three times before the music loops. These words do not appear in the arcade version; a snickering laugh is heard instead. The title, and boss themes are reversed on the PC port as well.

A version for mobile phones was released in Japan, and aimed to recreate the gameplay and locations from the arcade version. The pre-installed trial version containing the game's first chapter was included with Vodafone V603SH in February 2005, and utilized the phone's accelerometer functionality to control the camera.

Remake
In April 2021, it was announced that a remake of the game was to be released for the Nintendo Switch. The House of the Dead: Remake was developed by MegaPixel Studio and published by Forever Entertainment under license from Sega. In January 2022 news outlets reported that the game was expected to be launch in March 2022, but it was ultimately released on April 7, 2022. Ports for PlayStation 4, Stadia, Windows, and Xbox One were released on April 28, 2022, followed by Xbox Series X/S on September 23, 2022, and PlayStation 5 on January 20, 2023.

Sega reportedly lost the source code to the arcade version of The House of the Dead, requiring MegaPixel Studio to remake the entire game from scratch in the Unity game engine. Due to licensing issues, the original soundtrack by composer Tetsuya Kawauchi was replaced by a new soundtrack that is heavily inspired by the original.

Like the original home versions before, the remake uses an analog controlled crosshair for aiming by default. The Switch version also includes an alternative control by utilizing the controller’s built in “gyro aiming” system to emulate the use of a light gun, and the subsequent Xbox One and PS4 ports also had alternate control methods, such as USB mouse control and the PlayStation Move/Aim controllers respectively.

Reception and legacy

In Japan, Game Machine listed The House of the Dead on their May 1, 1997, issue as being the second most-successful dedicated arcade game of the month. The arcade game was also a major hit overseas. It went on to be the highest-grossing dedicated arcade game of 1998 in Japan. By 1998, it had sold 8,600 arcade cabinets worldwide, including 1,600 in Japan and 7,000 overseas.

Reviews
The 1996 arcade version of The House of the Dead received positive reviews upon release. Computer and Video Games magazine called it "the best shooting game ever!" Next Generation reviewed the arcade version of the game, rating it four stars out of five, and stated that "Overall, this is an excellent take on the light-gun genre - a sheer bloody scream." The review praised the branching levels, story, creature design, graphics, and destructible environments. In a retrospective review, AllGame awarded it 4.5 out of 5 stars, likewise praising the story, graphics, and destructible environments, but particularly focused on the game's intelligent challenge. The reviewer dubbed it "one of the best shooting games to hit arcades in the late 1990s."

The Saturn version of The House of the Dead garnered generally favorable reviews. It had a 71% rating on review aggregation website GameRankings based on five online reviews.

The Nintendo Switch remake received mixed reviews. Starburst applauded the accuracy of both the gyro controls and the thumbstick controls, the frantic tone of the new soundtrack, and the exciting atmosphere. They gave it four starbursts, concluding that "It's a fantastic revival of an old favourite, and the various ways that the original game has been updated and expanded upon add a lot of value to the overall package." Nintendo Life agreed that the game had "clearly been made with love for the source material", but had a different view of the controls. They explained that the Switch is not as ideally suited for light gun games as the Wii and Wii U due to its lack of a sensor bar, without which the gyro controls cause the cursor to twitch when firing. They said the thumbstick controls are more accurate but require fiddling with the sensitivity settings in order for them to feel right, and concluded that while the gameplay still held up and the graphical upgrades and extras were reasonably well done, those who are not fans of the original game might not have the patience for it. They gave it 6 out of 10 stars. Gaming Bible similarly commented that the graphical upgrades and extras are appealing, and the twitching cursor of the gyro controls is an overarching flaw. They concluded that newcomers to the game would only be frustrated, while fans of 1990s arcade games would be reasonably satisfied, and gave it a 5/10. Nook Gaming was laudatory of the gameplay and design: "The game uses clever camera angles and situations to trip you up ... learning how best to dispatch enemies is incredibly satisfying. Getting the best results requires you to see through the game’s trickery and play as efficiently as possible, wasting no bullet in your attempts to save everyone. As far as old-school shooters go, few are as unique and tightly designed." However, they found both the gyro controls and thumbstick controls unacceptably poor, and unlike other reviewers, said the graphics suffer too much from lack of polish and performance issues. While praising the new horde mode, they concluded that players should get a different version of The House of the Dead.

Cultural impact
According to Kim Newman in the book Nightmare Movies (2011), the "zombie revival began in the Far East" during the late 1990s with the Japanese zombie games Resident Evil and The House of the Dead.  The success of these two 1996 zombie games inspired a wave of Asian zombie films, such as Bio Zombie (1998) and Versus (2000). The zombie revival later went global following the worldwide success of Resident Evil and The House of the Dead, which inspired a wave of Western zombie films during the 2000s, such as 28 Days Later (2002) and Shaun of the Dead (2004). In 2013, George Romero said it was the video games Resident Evil and House of the Dead "more than anything else" that popularised his zombie concept in early 21st-century popular culture.

The House of the Dead has also been credited with introducing a new type of zombie distinct from Romero's classic slow zombie: the fast running zombie. After appearing in The House of the Dead, they became popular in zombie films and video games during the 2000s, including the Resident Evil games and films, The House of the Dead film adaptation, and the films 28 Days Later (2002) and Dawn of the Dead (2004).

Controversy
When the American city of Indianapolis attempted to ban violent video games in 2000, it argued that The House of the Dead was obscene and so unprotected by the First Amendment. This required U.S. Appeals Court Judge Richard Posner to review the game at length, ultimately finding Indianapolis' ban was unconstitutional. Unimpressed by the graphics, Judge Posner wrote "The most violent game in the record, The House of the Dead, depicts zombies being killed flamboyantly, with much severing of limbs and effusion of blood; but so stylized and patently fictitious is the cartoon-like depiction that no one would suppose it 'obscene' in the sense in which a photograph of a person being decapitated might be described as 'obscene.' It will not turn anyone's stomach."

Notes

References

Further reading

External links

 The House of the Dead at SegaSaturn.co.uk

1996 video games
1990s horror video games
Arcade video games
Cooperative video games
Light gun games
Mobile games
Multiplayer and single-player video games
Nintendo Switch games
PlayStation 4 games
PlayStation 5 games
PlayStation Move-compatible games
Rail shooters
Sega Saturn games
Sega arcade games
Sega video games
Stadia games
Tantalus Media games
The House of the Dead
Video games developed in Japan
Video games set in 1998
Video games set in Europe
Video games with alternate endings
WOW Entertainment games
Windows games
Xbox One games
Xbox Series X and Series S games
Forever Entertainment games